The 2020–21 Swiss Basketball League (SBL) season was the 90th season of the top tier basketball league in Switzerland.

Fribourg Olympic won its third title in a row and its 19th total title, after defeating eight-seeded Starwings in the finals of the playoffs.

Teams 
The league was reduced from 12 to 9 teams, after Riviera Lakers were refused a license to compete and Swiss Central and Pully-Lausanne Foxes requested to step down to Ligue B.

Regular season

League table

Results

Swiss clubs in European competitions

Playoffs

References

External links 
 

Championnat LNA seasons
Swiss
basketball
basketball